This list of Important Bird Areas in Japan details the 7  (EBAs) and 194  (IBAs), including 69 Marine IBAs, identified by BirdLife International and its domestic partner the Wild Bird Society of Japan as of April 2022.

Endemic Bird Areas

Secondary areas

Important Bird Areas

See also
 List of birds of Japan
 List of endemic birds of Japan
 List of Ramsar sites in Japan
 Yamashina Institute for Ornithology

References

Important Bird Areas of Japan